Ramsdellite (Mn4+O2) is an orthorhombic manganese dioxide mineral. It is relatively uncommon, and is usually found in deposits containing other manganese oxide crystals.

Name

Ramsdellite is named after the American mineralogist, Lewis Stephen Ramsdell (1895–1975).
Ramsdell spent almost all his career at the University of Michigan as a professional mineralogist.
Ramsdellite was one of the new phases he first recognized in the "black manganese oxide" minerals.
It was later named in his honour by Michael Fleischer and W. E. Richmond, who fully described the mineral in 1943.
The mineral is also called Groutellite.

Chemistry and crystallography

The chemical formula for Ramsdellite is MnO2. 
The empirical formula is Mn4+O2.
Ramsdellite has the same chemistry as the more common pyrolusite, but is orthorhombic where pyrolusite is tetragonal.
Ramsdellite belongs to the Orthorhombic crystal system and Dipyramidal crystal class.
Properties:

Classification

The Dana classification is 4.4.7.1 (simple oxides: AX2).
The Hey's CIM Ref is 7.18.8 (Oxides and Hydroxides, Oxides of Mn).
The Nickel–Strunz classification is 04.DB.15a, since the metal:oxygen ratio is around 1:2 and the mineral has medium-sized cations; chains of edge-sharing octahedra.
Other elements in the Ramsdellite / 04.DB.15 group are Paramontroseite: V4+O2 (15a), Akhtenskite: ε-Mn4+O2 (15b) and Nsutite: (Mn4+,Mn2+)(O,OH)2 (15c).

Distribution

Ramsdellite is formed by oxidization of weathered manganese minerals such as manganite, and is often found in deposits containing various other manganese oxides.
The mineral is relatively rare. 
The type locality, the place where Ramsdellite was first identified, is the Lake Valley district in Sierra County, New Mexico, USA.
Other locations in the USA where well-characterized samples of Ramsdellite have been found are Artillery Mountains, Arizona; Mistake mine, Yavapai County, Arizona; Idarado mine, near Telluride, Colorado; and Monroe-Tener mine, near Chisholm, Minnesota.

Good samples have been found in Canada along the East River in Pictou County, Nova Scotia; in Mexico in Los Gavilanes, Baja California; In India in Dongari Buzurg, Bhandara, Maharashtra; in Australia in the Iron Monarch quarry, Iron Knob, South Australia; in Japan in the Otoshibetsu and Tanno mines, Hokkaido; in the Czech Republic at Horní Blatná; in Germany at Bütten-Adenstadt, Lower Saxony and Clara Mine, near Oberwolfach, Black Forest; in Egypt at Gebel To Yu, Yoider, and Um Bogna; and in South Africa at Hotazel, near Kuruman, Northern Cape.
Ramsdellite is found in the manganese deposits near Moanda, Haut-Ogooué Province, Gabon, mined by the Compagnie minière de l'Ogooué.
These deposits were formed by supergene enrichment of Precambrian sediments.

Notes

Sources

 

Manganese(IV) minerals
Orthorhombic minerals
Minerals in space group 62
Oxide minerals